Varnamtown is a town in Brunswick County, North Carolina, United States situated on the banks of the Lockwood Folly River. The population was 541 at the 2010 census. It is part of the Myrtle Beach metropolitan area.

History
Varnamtown was incorporated as a town in 1988.

Geography
Varnamtown is located in southern Brunswick County at  (33.944172, -78.231012). It is bordered to the east by the tidal Lockwood Folly River.

Demographics

As of the census of 2000, there were 481 people, 203 households, and 155 families residing in the town. The population density was 480.2 people per square mile (185.7/km). There were 235 housing units at an average density of 234.6 per square mile (90.7/km). The racial makeup of the town was 99.17% White, 0.42% Native American, 0.21% Asian, and 0.21% from two or more races. Hispanic or Latino of any race were 0.62% of the population.

There were 203 households, out of which 27.1% had children under the age of 18 living with them, 70.0% were married couples living together, 3.9% had a female householder with no husband present, and 23.2% were non-families. 20.2% of all households were made up of individuals, and 8.9% had someone living alone who was 65 years of age or older. The average household size was 2.37 and the average family size was 2.72.

In the town, the population was spread out, with 19.5% under the age of 18, 5.6% from 18 to 24, 28.5% from 25 to 44, 29.5% from 45 to 64, and 16.8% who were 65 years of age or older. The median age was 42 years. For every 100 females, there were 102.1 males. For every 100 females age 18 and over, there were 98.5 males.

The median income for a household in the town was $33,750, and the median income for a family was $35,357. Males had a median income of $29,375 versus $25,694 for females. The per capita income for the town was $18,394. About 9.8% of families and 11.4% of the population were below the poverty line, including 16.5% of those under age 18 and 17.5% of those age 65 or over.

References

Towns in Brunswick County, North Carolina
Towns in North Carolina
Populated coastal places in North Carolina